Pleasures of the Rich is a 1926 American silent romantic drama film directed by Louis J. Gasnier and produced by Tiffany Pictures with a general distribution through Renown Pictures. The film featured several well known performers of the time, such as Helene Chadwick, Jack Mulhall, Hedda Hopper and Mary Carr.

The film is now considered lost. Its trailer still exists and is housed at the Library of Congress.

Cast
 Helene Chadwick - Mary Wilson
 Jack Mulhall - Frank Clayton
 Hedda Hopper - Mona Vincent
 Mary Carr - Kate Wilson
 Marcin Asher - Henry 'Pushcart' Wilson
 Lillian Langdon - Mrs. Clayton
 Dorothea Wolbert - Maggie the Maid
 Julanne Johnston - Phylliss Worthing
 Katherine Scott - Mrs. Worthing

References

External links

 
 

1926 romantic drama films
American romantic drama films
American silent feature films
American black-and-white films
Films based on short fiction
Films directed by Louis J. Gasnier
Lost American films
Tiffany Pictures films
1926 films
1926 lost films
Silent romantic drama films
1920s American films
Silent American drama films